The 2021 Women's Pan American Challenge was the third edition of the Women's Pan American Challenge, the quadrennial qualification tournament for the Women's Pan American Cup organized by the Pan American Hockey Federation.

The tournament was held alongside the men's tournament in Lima, Peru from 26 September to 2 October 2021. The tournament was originally scheduled to be held from 27 June to 5 July 2020. Due to the COVID-19 pandemic, the tournament was postponed and on 4 February 2021 the current dates were announced. The finalists qualified for the 2022 Women's Pan American Cup.

Preliminary round

Pool

Matches

Classification round

Bracket

Semi-finals

Third place game

Final

Statistics

Final standings

Goalscorers

See also
2021 Men's Pan American Challenge

References

Women's Pan American Challenge
Pan American Challenge
International women's field hockey competitions hosted by Peru
Pan American Challenge
Pan American Challenge
Pan American Challenge
Pan American Challenge
Sports competitions in Lima
2020s in Lima